Hassan Eslami (born March 23, 1984) is an Iranian footballer. He currently plays for Saipa in the IPL.

Career
Eslami joined Saipa F.C. in 2012 after spending previous season with Paykan F.C.

Club career statistics

References

1984 births
Living people
Saipa F.C. players
Iranian footballers
Paykan F.C. players
Sportspeople from Tehran
Association football defenders